The Public Service Broadcasting Trust is an Indian non-governmental organisation. It helps independent documentary film-makers to work free from commercial and political pressures. It hosts the annual Open Frame film festival in New Delhi.

References 

Cultural organisations based in India
Film organisations in India
Indian film distributors
Film production companies of India
Film production companies of Delhi